Trent Jamieson is an Australian writer of speculative fiction.

Biography
Jamieson was first published in 1994 with the short story "Threnody" which was published in the winter edition Eidolon (Australian magazine). In 2003 Jamieson was nominated for the Ditmar Award for best professional achievement but lost to Jonathan Strahan. In 2005 Jamieson won the Aurealis Award for best science fiction short story with his story "Slow and Ache". In 2008 he won his second Aurealis Award. "Cracks" won the Aurealis Award for best young-adult short story, beating works by Deborah Biancotti, Dirk Flinthart and Kevin MacLean. In 2010 his first novel, Death Most Definite, was published by Orbit Books and was nominated for the Aurealis Award for best horror novel and the Aurealis Award for best fantasy novel. Death Most Definite is the first part of the Death Works series and was followed by a sequel Managing Death in early 2011. Jamieson is currently writing a duology for Angry Robot Books and the third novel in the Death Works series.

Jamieson is a former teacher at Clarion South Writers Workshop and is a seasonal academic at the Queensland University of Technology. He is also a former editor for the magazine Redsine. Jamieson currently lives in Brisbane, Queensland, Australia and works at The Avid Reader Bookshop.

Awards and nominations

Bibliography

Novels
Death Works
Death Most Definite (2010)
Managing Death (2011)
The Business of Death (September 2011)

Other
Roil (30 August 2011)
Night's Engines (2012)
Day Boy (2015)

Short fiction
"Threnody" (1994) in Eidolon (Australian magazine) Winter 1994 (ed. Jonathan Strahan, Jeremy G. Byrne)
"Naked" (1999) in Altair No. 3 (ed. Robert N. Stephenson, Jim Deed, Andrew Collings)
"Carousel" (2000) in Aurealis #25/26 (ed. Dirk Strasser, Stephen Higgins)
"A Thief Is a King in the Halls of the Night" (2001) in AustrAlien Absurdities (ed. Chuck McKenzie, Tansy Rayner Roberts)
"Tar Baby" (2002) in Agog! Fantastic Fiction (ed. Cat Sparks)
"The Catling God" (2002) in Andromeda Spaceways Inflight Magazine No. 1 (ed. Ben Payne)
"Wind Down" (2002) in Aurealis No. 30 (ed. Keith Stevenson)
"Endure" (2004) in Agog! Smashing Stories (ed. Cat Sparks)
"Don't Got No Wings" (2004) in Encounters (ed. Maxine McArthur, Donna Maree Hanson)
"Generous Furniture" (2004) in Glass Onion (ed. D. F. Lewis)
"Porcelain Salli" (2004) in Aurealis #33–35, (ed. Keith Stevenson)
"Five Bells" (2005) in Daikaiju! Giant Monster Tales (ed. Robin Pen, Robert Hood)
"Tumble" (2005) in Australian Dark Fantasy and Horror 2006 (ed. Shane Jiraiya Cummings, Angela Challis)
"Neighbours" (2005) in The Devil in Brisbane (ed. Zoran Zivkovic)
"Slow and Ache" (2005) in Aurealis No. 36 (ed. Ben Payne, Robert Hoge)
"Marco's Tooth" (2006) in Andromeda Spaceways Inflight Magazine No. 22 (ed. Tansy Rayner Roberts)
"Cracks" (2008) in Shiny No. 2
"Delivery" (2008) in Cosmos Magazine June–July 2008 (ed. Damien Broderick, Wilson da Silva)
"The New Deal" (2008) in Dreaming Again (ed. Jack Dann)
"The Lighterman's Tale" (2009) in Canterbury 2100: Pilgrimages in a New World (ed. Dirk Flinthart)
"The Neighbourhood of Dead Monsters" (2009) in Aurealis No. 42 (ed. Stuart Mayne)
"Iron Temple" (2009) in X6 (ed. Keith Stevenson)
"Temptation" (2010) in Scenes from the Second Storey (ed. Amanda Pillar, Pete Kempshall)

Anthologies
Fantastical Journeys to Brisbane (2008) edited with Geoffrey Maloney and Zoran Zivkovic

Collections
Reserved for Travelling Shows (2006)

Editor contributions
Redsine, fiction editor for the magazine
The Etched City (2003), a novel by K. J. Bishop

References
General

Specific

Living people
21st-century Australian novelists
Australian horror writers
Australian male novelists
Australian male short story writers
Year of birth missing (living people)
21st-century Australian short story writers
21st-century Australian male writers